The 1966 Minnesota lieutenant gubernatorial election took place on November 8, 1966. Republican Party of Minnesota candidate James B. Goetz defeated Minnesota Democratic-Farmer-Labor Party challenger Robert E. Short.

Results

External links
 Election Returns

Minnesota
Lieutenant Gubernatorial
1966